= Al-Sanobar =

Al-Sanobar is a coastal village in Latakia Governorate, Syria.
